The Xbox 360 Wireless Racing Wheel was developed by Microsoft for the Xbox 360 and was introduced at E3 2006. Released in November 2006, the force feedback steering wheel controller includes the standard gamepad buttons along with floor-mounted accelerator and brake pedals. Although the wheel is capable of running truly wirelessly from a standard Xbox 360 battery pack (rechargeable or two AA batteries), use of the force feedback and active resistance features requires an external AC adapter.

The original limited edition of the force feedback wheel included a force-feedback capable version of the racing game Project Gotham Racing 3. This was discontinued in November 2007 when the price of the wheel was dropped to $99.

The wheel was developed in conjunction with the video game Forza Motorsport 2.

Supported games 
The following games are "fully supported" with force feedback for Xbox 360:

 Burnout Paradise
 Dirt
 Dirt 2
 Dirt 3
 Daytona USA
 F1 2010
 F1 2011
 F1 2012
 F1 2013
 F1 2014
 Forza Motorsport 2†
 Forza Motorsport 3†
 Forza Motorsport 4
 Forza Horizon
 Forza Horizon 2
 Grid
 Hydro Thunder Hurricane
 Juiced 2: Hot Import Nights
 Midnight Club: Los Angeles
 NASCAR 08
 NASCAR 09
 Need for Speed: Carbon
.  Need for speed: Most wanted (2012 version only. The 2005 version does not support the force feedback wheel.) 
 Need for Speed: ProStreet
 Need for Speed: Undercover
 Need for Speed: Shift
 Need for Speed: The Run
 Need for Speed: Hot Pursuit
 Project Gotham Racing 3†
 Project Gotham Racing 4†
 Race Pro
 Sega Rally Revo
 Sega Rally Online Arcade
 Sonic & Sega All-Stars Racing
 Stuntman: Ignition
 Superstars V8 Racing
 Test Drive Unlimited (Hardcore mode is recommended)
 Test Drive Unlimited 2
 WRC 2010
 WRC 3: FIA World Rally Championship
 WRC 4: FIA World Rally Championship
† Bundled Xbox 360 race game.

The following games are supported on Windows Vista x64. This does not include force feedback- steering and rumble only:
 Colin McRae: Dirt
 Sega Rally Revo
 Pure
 Burnout Paradise: The Ultimate Box
 Race Driver: Grid - Need to 1.2 version patch

The following  original Xbox games are supported. This does not include force feedback- steering and rumble only: Xbox 360 backward compatibility:
007: Nightfire (cars only)
4x4 EVO 2
Auto Modellista
Burnout 2: Point of Impact
Burnout 3: Takedown
Colin McRae Rally 04
Colin McRae Rally 2005
Crash Nitro Kart
EA Sports F1 2001
EA Sports F1 2002
F1 Career Challenge
Ford Mustang: The Legend Lives
Ford vs. Chevy
Forza Motorsport
Grand Theft Auto III (cars only)
Grand Theft Auto: Vice City (cars only)
Grand Theft Auto: San Andreas (cars only)
Hot Wheels: Stunt Track Challenge
IHRA Drag Racing: Sportsman Edition
IHRA Professional Drag Racing 2005
IndyCar Series
IndyCar Series 2005
Jurassic Park: Operation Genesis (cars only)
NASCAR 06: Total Team Control (during gameplay, glitches mode on can make car's speed into 300 mph)
NASCAR Thunder 2002
NASCAR Thunder 2003
Need for Speed: Hot Pursuit 2
Need for Speed: Underground
Need for Speed: Underground 2
OutRun 2
OutRun 2006: Coast 2 Coast
Project Gotham Racing
Project Gotham Racing 2
Rallisport Challenge
Sega GT 2002
Sega GT 2002/JSRF Combo pack (Sega GT 2002 only)
Sega GT Online
Sonic Heroes (bobsled only)
Street Racing Syndicate
Test Drive
Test Drive: Eve of Destruction
TOCA Race Driver
TOCA Race Driver 2
TOCA Race Driver 3

Recall
On August 22, 2007 an announcement on the official Xbox website stated that Microsoft will retrofit for free all the Wireless Racing Wheels that were manufactured during 2006 and 2007. This is due to a component in the wheel chassis that in rare cases may overheat and release smoke when the AC/DC power supply is used to power up the wheel.

According to Microsoft the retrofit of the Xbox 360 Wireless Racing Wheel is only required on products with SKU numbers 9Z1-00001, 9Z1-00002, 9Z1-00003, 9Z1-00004, 9Z1-00009, 9Z1-00011, 9Z1-00012, 9Z1-00013, 9Z1-00017, 9Z1-00018  and Wheel part numbers X809211-001, X809211-002, X809211-003, X809211-004, X809211-005.

The SKU number can be found on a label on the bottom side of the retail carton and the Wheel part numbers are found on a label on the bottom side of the dashboard assembly. Any SKU or Wheel not included in this list will not require the retrofit.

Discontinuation and successor
The Xbox 360 Wireless Racing Wheel was discontinued in 2007 when the price of the wheel was dropped to $99. It no longer seemed to be supplied to stores, and Microsoft had removed mention of it from the official Xbox web site.

The successor, the Microsoft Xbox 360 Wireless Speed Wheel was released on September 26, 2011.

See also
 Xbox 360 accessories
 Racing video game

References

External links
Fire Hazard (MegaTechNews.com
 http://blog.codemasters.com/f1/10/f1-2014-supported-wheel-list/

Wireless Racing Wheel